Albizia ferruginea (locally known as musase) is a species of plant in the family Fabaceae. It is found in Angola, Benin, Burkina Faso, Cameroon, Central African Republic, the Republic of the Congo, the Democratic Republic of the Congo, Ivory Coast, Gabon, Gambia, Ghana, Guinea, Guinea-Bissau, Nigeria, Senegal, Sierra Leone, Togo, and Uganda. It is threatened by deforestation.

References

External links

ferruginea
Flora of West Tropical Africa
Flora of West-Central Tropical Africa
Trees of Africa
Afrotropical realm flora
Vulnerable flora of Africa
Taxa named by George Bentham
Taxonomy articles created by Polbot